Palaphoom Kovapitukted (born 5 December 1999) is a Thai tennis player.

Kovapitukted has a career high ATP singles ranking of 1305 achieved on 8 October 2018. He also has a career high ATP doubles ranking of 872, which was achieved on 8 October 2018.

Kovapitukted has represented Thailand at the Davis Cup, where he has a win–loss record of 1–3.

ATP Challenger and ITF World Tennis Tour finals

Singles: 1 (1–0)

External links

1999 births
Living people
Palaphoom Kovapitukted
Tennis players at the 2018 Asian Games
Palaphoom Kovapitukted